A secondary  hospital, secondary referral center or a secondary care center refers to a hospital in the United States which can support licensed physicians in pediatrics, obstetrics, and gynecology, general surgery and other supporting medical services.

See also
Tertiary referral hospital
Health care, Primary care, Secondary care, Tertiary care

References

Types of hospitals